Ildefonso Ramos Mexía y Ross (August 2, 1769 – June 24, 1854) was an Argentine military man and politician, who served as alcalde, governor and legislator of Buenos Aires.

He was born in Buenos Aires, the son of Gregorio Ramos Mexía, born in Sevilla, and María Cristina Ross, belonging to a family of Scottish and Creole origin. He was married with his relative María Inés Basavilbaso, daughter of José Ramón Basavilbaso and María Lorenza Ferrín.

References 

1769 births
1854 deaths
People from Buenos Aires
People from Buenos Aires Province
Spanish colonial governors and administrators
Argentine people of Spanish descent
Argentine people of Scottish descent
Argentine Army officers
Governors of Buenos Aires Province
Río de la Plata